The enzyme deoxylimonate A-ring-lactonase (EC 3.1.1.46) catalyzes the reaction

deoxylimonate + H2O  deoxylimononic acid D-ring-lactone

The reaction opens the A-ring-lactone of the triterpenoid deoxylimonic acid, leaving the D-ring-lactone intact.

This enzyme belongs to the family of hydrolases, specifically those acting on carboxylic ester bonds.  The systematic name is deoxylimonate A-ring-lactonohydrolase.

References

 

EC 3.1.1
Enzymes of unknown structure